Eric James Bransby (October 25, 1916 – September 23, 2020) was an American artist and muralist. He studied and made murals in Colorado Springs, Colorado, including several at the Colorado Springs Fine Arts Center. He taught at Yale University, Brigham Young University, and University of Missouri-Kansas City.

Early years and personal life
Eric Bransby was born in October 1916 in Auburn, New York to Lillian Holland Dowsett Bransby and Charles Carson Bransby. He was raised in Pittsburgh, Pennsylvania and then in Council Bluffs, Iowa. His father was born in Manchester, England, raised in Scotland and was a preacher. His mother was born in New Zealand and raised in London, England.

Bransby was married for nearly 70 years to Mary Ann, until her death in August, 2011. Mary Ann Hemmie, daughter of Joe and Lillian Hemmie was an artist and educator. Mary Ann attended the Kansas City Art Institute on a scholarship and studied silversmithing. She studied and mastered watercolor painting under Thomas Hart Benton. Two weeks before the Pearl Harbor Attack in December 1941, Mary Ann married Eric Bransby, who was a fellow student;. Their daughter, Fredericka was born in June, 1943. Their daughter developed asthma and the family returned to Colorado Springs for a more favorable climate for Fredericka.

He turned 100 in October 2016 and died in September 2020 at the age of 103.

Education
During the Great Depression, Bransby studied under Thomas Hart Benton in Kansas City. He created his first mural for the Works Progress Administration in Kansas City, Kansas. After World War II, Bransby continued his studies on the G.I. Bill. He studied at the Colorado Springs Fine Arts Center School. His wife also studied at the school. Both were students of Boardman Robinson. and then Eric was a student of Jean Charlot, who helped him finish the thesis for Colorado College and paint the college's Cossitt Hall domed ceiling in 1947.

Aside from his teachers and himself, other key muralists at Colorado Springs Fine Arts Center during the New Deal era included Archie Musick, Ethel Magafan, George Biddle, and Edgar Britton. In 1952 he studied at Yale under abstract colorist Josef Albers.

World War II
Bransby served as a soldier in the Army during World War II. His wife designed parts and die forms for B-52 bombers.

Career
Bransby taught at Yale University, Brigham Young University, and University of Missouri in Kansas City. His wife also taught at Brigham Young University.

Works
 Resilience mural (2012), made for the Colorado Springs Fine Arts Center's Glass Corridor, was made to celebrate the center's 75th Anniversary. The mural includes the history of the center and art forms, including dance, theatre and music. The 5' by 27' mural was made when Bransby was 94 years of age and was dedicated April 20, 2012. After his wife's death, former art student Rev. Bradford N. Bray suggested to Bransby that he add her to the mural of the History of the Fine Arts Center. She was depicted as a student of Robinson.
 Frescos (1986) were repainted by Bransby over the Colorado Springs Fine Arts Center's front entrance for its 50th Anniversary. The frescos were originally painted by Boardman Robinson in 1936, but had faded over time. Blake Milteer, the museum's director stated that: "Bransby masterfully enhanced Robinson's original forms with his own details on the original facade."
 Student Achievement mural, Nichols Hall, Kansas State University (1986). The mural, dedicated on October 10, 1986, depicts the history of Nichols Hall on the east wall of the atrium.
 History of Navigation (1968) was commissioned by the United States Air Force Planetarium and has been on loan from the Air Force Academy to the Colorado Springs Fine Arts Center. Made the year before the moon landing, mural panels totally 30 feet in length, depict navigation history up to space travel. The work was made in polymer and tempera.
 Mural on a wall of the Colorado Springs Fine Arts Center (1950s). The mural was torn down during a renovation in the 1970s.
 "Legacy of St Paul" (1986) commissioned by St Paul Lutheran Church and Academy, Skokie, Illinois.

Publications
The following are publications by or about Bransby:
 
 
  A film documentary, 2019

Notes

References

1916 births
2020 deaths
20th-century American painters
21st-century American painters
American centenarians
American male painters
American muralists
American people of English descent
Artists from Auburn, New York
Artists from Colorado Springs, Colorado
Artists from Pittsburgh
Brigham Young University faculty
Colorado College alumni
Men centenarians
Military personnel from New York (state)
University of Missouri–Kansas City faculty
Works Progress Administration workers
Yale University alumni
United States Army personnel of World War II
United States Army soldiers